Elvira Guerra (1855–1937) was an Italian equestrienne and circus performer, notable for competing at the 1900 Summer Olympics, the first Games at which women were allowed to compete. She was the first woman to represent Italy at the Olympics.

Life
Guerra was born in Saint Petersburg around 1855, daughter of circus performer Rodolfo Guerra.

The Times mentions her in an 1882 article on Hengler's Grand Cirque. In 1890, she opened the Grand Hippodrome in Bordeaux.

In 1900, she competed in the 1900 Summer Olympics in the hacks and hunter combined (chevaux de selle) atop her horse Libertin, one of only two female riders, finishing outside the top four.

She died in Marseille in 1937. A street in Bordeaux is named Rue Elvira Guerra in her honour.

References

External links

1855 births
1937 deaths
Olympic equestrians of Italy
Equestrians at the 1900 Summer Olympics
Italian female equestrians
Italian circus performers
Sportspeople from Saint Petersburg
Sportspeople from Bordeaux
19th-century circus performers
20th-century circus performers